Captains Mountain is a locality in the Toowoomba Region, Queensland, Australia.

Geography 
The south-west of the locality is Western Creek State Forest. The remainder of the locality is used for farming, mostly grazing but with some cropping.

The Gore Highway passes through the locality from the north-east (Millmerran) and then exits to the south-west forming part of the south-western boundary (adjacent to Cypress Gardens and Millmerran Downs).

History 
The locality is named for the mountain Captains Mountain  within the locality.

In 1914, the Captain's Mountain Co-operative Dairy Company was formed with 275 shares at a cost of  each. The company built a cheese factory. In March 1916, the factory processed  to produce  of cheese. The factory was still operating in 1931, but was contemplating closure in 1934, and had closed by 1939.

Captain's Mountain Provisional School opened on 30 January 1922, becoming Captain's Mountain State School in 1957. It closed in 1962.

Education 
There are no schools in Captains Mountain. The nearest primary and secondary school to Year 10 is in Millmerran and the nearest secondary school to Year 12 in is Pittsworth.

References 

Toowoomba Region
Localities in Queensland